Esdras Rangel (born 31 July 1977) is a Mexican former professional football goalkeeper. He was a member of the Mexican squad for the 1997 FIFA World Youth Championship in Malaysia. but did not play in the tournament.

He last played for Jaguares de Tapachula at 2007-08 opening season. He played for Petroleros de Salamanca at 2005-06 Primera División A season.

References

External links
 

1977 births
Living people
Mexican footballers
Mexico under-20 international footballers
Association football goalkeepers
Chiapas F.C. footballers
Club Universidad Nacional footballers
Salamanca F.C. footballers
Liga MX players
Ascenso MX players
Footballers from Mexico City